Eucalyptus diversicolor, commonly known as karri, is a species of flowering plant in the family Myrtaceae and is endemic to the south-west of Western Australia. It is a tall tree with smooth light grey to cream-coloured, often mottled bark, lance-shaped adult leaves and barrel-shaped fruit. Found in higher rainfall areas, karri is commercially important for its timber.

Description
As of February 2019, the tallest known living karri is just over 80m tall. A tree south of Pemberton, known as 'The Tyrant' is 69m tall and 11.5m in girth and contains approximately 220m³ of wood in its trunk and is thought to be the largest karri by wood volume. The bark on the trunk and branches is smooth, grey to cream-coloured or pale orange, often mottled and is shed in short ribbons or small polygonal flakes.

Flowering has been observed in January, April, May, August and December, and the flowers are white.

Taxonomy
Eucalyptus diversicolor was first formally described in 1863 by the botanist Ferdinand von Mueller in his book Fragmenta Phytographiae Australiae. The type specimen was collected in 1860 by the botanist Augustus Frederick Oldfield near Wilson Inlet, the location given, in Latin, is In Australiae regionibus depressioribus quam Maxime austro occidentalibus, ubi Blue Gum-tree vocatur.

The botanical name diversicolor is taken from the Latin word diversus meaning to turn apart and color or "separate colours" and refers to the difference between the top of the leaf and its underside.
The common name is derived from the Noongar name for the tree karri pronounces ka-ree.

Distribution and habitat

Karri occurs only within the High Rainfall Zone of the South West Botanical Province of Western Australia which receives  of rain per year, mostly in winter.<ref name=fpc>{{cite web|url=http://www.fpc.wa.gov.au/node/841|title=Karri Eucalyptus diversicolor|access-date=2 December 2017|publisher=Forest Products Commission}}</ref> It mostly occurs within the Warren biogeographic region, but there are some outlying populations including the Porongorup Ranges, Mount Manypeaks, Torbay, Rocky Gully all along the south coast and Karridale and Forest Grove to the north west and the Leeuwin-Naturaliste Ridge to the south of Margaret River to the west of the main belt.

The heart of the karri forest is found near Nannup and Manjimup through to Denmark.

Ecology
Some karri specimens are thought to reach an age of up to 300 years. The soil in which the species grows is often poor, and the tree tends to flower after fire to take advantage of the nutrients released by the combustion of forest litter. The soil is classified as karri loam. Though low in some minor nutrients it is admired for its depth and pasture-growing properties. The depth of the soil is several metres and thought to be created primarily from the bark shed by the tree, which collects at the trunk base to a depth upwards of six metres in mature trees. The karri supports an extensive ecosystem which is connected to the granite outcrops of the lower south-west and the many subsequent creeks and rivers created from runoff. Karri generally dominate in the deep valleys between granite outcrops surrounding the creeks and rivers.

A dense understorey is found in karri forest areas which retains moisture over the hot summers. Associated trees and shrubs found in the understorey include the peppermint (Agonis flexuosa), karri sheoak (Allocasuarina decussata), karri wattle (Acacia pentadenia) and karri oak (Chorilaena quercifolia). A diverse assemblage of flowers and smaller plants – around 2,000 plant taxa – make up the mosaic of habitats within the karri forests.

The species is considered invasive in South Africa where it is a problem in the Western Cape region and is locally known a karie. It commonly invades clearings, fynbos, water courses and road sides often out competing local species and is spread easily by seed dispersal.

Uses

The tree has been logged since the settlement of Western Australia with logging towns appearing throughout the range of the tree and producing hardwood timbers, mostly for construction purposes, for the first 150 years since settlement. The first Karri timber to be felled for export was at the isolated population around Leeuwin, which became known as Karridale. The virtues of the wood were promoted in the 1920s by the state conservator of forests, Charles Lane-Poole, who noted the colonists' preference for other timber as its vulnerability to white ants made it a poor choice for fence posts and railway sleepers. The timber found uses in the state for wagon spokes and wooden pipes, and in England it was found suitable for scantlings by the national railway and telegraph arms by the postal services and was listed among Lloyds shipbuilding timbers as possessing great strength over large lengths.

Fire lookouts were established in the forests using the tallest Karri trees, giving the foresters a commanding view of the landscape.
The idea of using karri trees in this way was first suggested in 1937 by a young forester, Don Stewart, who later became Conservator of Forests. The first of these was built on a large marri (Corymbia calophylla) at Alco, near Nannup. Eight lookouts were established in the forests between 1937 and 1952. Spotter planes are now used and some of the trees are now used as tourist attractions.

Karri wood is a beautiful mahogany colour, lighter in colour than jarrah. It is used extensively in the building industry, particularly in roofs for the length and knot-free quality of the boards. The wood is also used for flooring, furniture, cabinetry and plywood. The heartwood is golden to reddish brown, often with an orange or purple cast, and tends to darken with age. It has an interlocked grain with a uniform medium-coarse texture. It has the reputation of being termite-prone, although it is nowhere near as susceptible to these insects as pine. It is durable against rot. It is also an excellent furniture wood. Karri honey is widely sought after for its light color and delicate flavor. Tourism to this area is also supported by the Karri.

Some of the main streets of early Sydney were paved with blocks of Karri but have been long since covered by asphalt. The wood was also sent to London for the same purpose.

The species is commercially available and sold in seed form. It germinates readily and prefers a protected sunny position, but is known to be both drought- and frost-sensitive.

See also
Dave Evans Bicentennial Tree
Diamond Tree
List of tallest trees
Warren (biogeographic region), also known as the Karri Forest Region.

Gallery

References

Further reading
 Boland, D. J., et al. (1984). Forest Trees of Australia (Fourth edition revised and enlarged)'', CSIRO Publishing, Collingwood, Victoria, Australia. .

External links
 
 Department of Conservation and Environment – information page.

diversicolor
Endemic flora of Southwest Australia
Trees of Australia
Forests of Western Australia
Mallees (habit)
Myrtales of Australia
Eucalypts of Western Australia
Trees of Mediterranean climate
Warren bioregion
Plants described in 1863
Taxa named by Ferdinand von Mueller